Joseph Okoro (born 17 February 2001) is a Nigerian football player.

Club career
He played for FC Dynamo Kyiv in the 2019–20 UEFA Youth League.

He made his debut in the Russian Football National League for FC Olimp-Dolgoprudny on 8 August 2021 in a game against FC Torpedo Moscow.

References

External links
 
 Profile by Russian Football National League

2001 births
Living people
Nigerian footballers
Association football midfielders
FC Gomel players
Russian First League players
Nigerian expatriate footballers
Expatriate footballers in Ukraine
Nigerian expatriate sportspeople in Ukraine
Expatriate footballers in Belarus
Nigerian expatriate sportspeople in Belarus
Expatriate footballers in Russia
Nigerian expatriate sportspeople in Russia
FC Olimp-Dolgoprudny players